Oberea umebayashii is a species of beetle in the family Cerambycidae. It was described by Ohbayashi in 1964. It is known from Japan.

References

Beetles described in 1964
umebayashii